Lectionary 1967 designated by sigla ℓ 1967 (in the Gregory-Aland numbering), is a Greek minuscule manuscript of the New Testament, written on 241 parchment and paper leaves (24.6 cm by 18.5 cm). Paleographically it has been assigned to the 11th century.

Description 

The codex contains Lessons from the four Gospels lectionary (Evangelistarium). Leaves 1-230 are written on parchment, leaves 231-241 on paper. Paper was added at the end. Written in two columns per page, in 20 lines per page.

History 

The codex now is located in the Kenneth Willis Clark Collection of the Duke University (Gk MS 24)  at Durham.

See also 
 List of New Testament lectionaries
 Biblical manuscripts 
 Textual criticism

References

Further reading 
 Normann A. Huffman, "The Text of Mark in the Duke New Testament", unpublished M.A. thesis, Duke University, 1932.

External links 

 Lectionary 1967 at the Kenneth Willis Clark Collection of Greek Manuscripts 

Greek New Testament lectionaries
11th-century biblical manuscripts
Duke University Libraries